Caroline Street may refer to:

Caroline Street (Hamilton, Ontario), Canada
Caroline Street (Cardiff), Wales
Caroline Street (Baltimore), United States
Caroline Street Line
Caroline Street (Key West), United States